The 1815 Vermont gubernatorial election for Governor of Vermont took place in September and October, and resulted in the election of Jonas Galusha to a one-year term.

The Vermont General Assembly met in Montpelier on October 12. The Vermont House of Representatives appointed a committee to review the votes of the freemen of Vermont for governor, lieutenant governor, treasurer, and members of the governor's council. The committee determined that former governor Jonas Galusha had defeated incumbent Martin Chittenden to win a one-year term. 

In the election for lieutenant governor, the legislature's canvassing committee determined that former lieutenant governor Paul Brigham had attained a majority over incumbent William Chamberlain to win election to a one-year term. According to a contemporary newspaper article, the vote totals were: Brigham, 16,942 (50.4%); Chamberlain 15,841 (47.2%); scattering, 807 (2.4%).

Benjamin Swan was elected to a one-year term as treasurer, his sixteenth, though the vote totals were not recorded. Swan, a Federalist was also endorsed by the Democratic-Republicans, and so was effectively unopposed for reelection.

In the race for governor, the results of the popular vote were reported as follows.

Results

References

Vermont gubernatorial elections
gubernatorial
Vermont